Deer Parks Wildlife Management Area is a  Idaho wildlife management area in Madison County near the town of Roberts. Land in the WMA was acquired in 1997 and 1999 for partial mitigation of the effects of the construction of the Palisades Dam.

Most of the region's waterfowl species can be found in the WMA, including trumpeter swans. The WMA is open to non-motorized travel all year and hunting in fall.

References

protected areas established in 1997
protected areas of Jefferson County, Idaho
protected areas of Madison County, Idaho
wildlife management areas of Idaho